The Shanxi–Henan–Shandong railway or the Jinyulu railway, also known as the Shanxi South Central railway or the Watang–Rizhao railway, is an electrified double-track heavy freight railway across northern China. The line runs  from the village of Watang in Lüliang, Shanxi Province to the port of Rizhao in Shandong Province, and is named after the three provinces through which it passes Jin (Shanxi), Yu (Henan) and Lu (Shandong). The line is the world's longest heavy freight railway and is designed to facilitate the export of coal from Shanxi to overseas markets. Cities along route include Lüliang, Liulin, Hongdong, Changzhi and Pingshun in Shanxi; Linzhou, Anyang, Tangyin, Puyang, Hebi, Fan County and Taiqian County in Henan; Liangshan County, Dongping, Ningyang, Xintai, Laiwu, Yiyuan, Yishui, Ju County, Junan and Rizhao in Shandong. The line was built from 2010 to 2014 and operations began on December 30, 2014.

Line description
The Jinyulu railway passes through mountainous terrain in south central Shanxi and central Shandong. Bridges and tunnels account for 46.8% of the line's total length. The line provides central Shanxi with another rail outlet to the sea and can carry 200 million tons of freight per year.

The lines required Y103.8 billion in investments and as of 2012, was jointly owned by China's railway ministry (34.29% of shares); the Shanxi Energy & Transport Investment Company, a company owned by the Shanxi Provincial Government (20%); Bank of China (14.45%); and local governments and other coal companies.

Passenger service
On 18 March 2016, a passenger service was introduced on a section of the line. One train per day runs to and from Puyang railway station, using the section of the line between Tangyin and Puyang.

Rail connections
Shanxi
 Liulin: Taiyuan–Zhongwei–Yinchuan railway
 Hongdong: Datong–Puzhou railway
 Changzhi: Taiyuan–Jiaozuo railway, Handan–Changzhi railway
Henan
 Anyang: connection to Beijing–Guangzhou railway
 Puyang: connection to Beijing–Kowloon railway
Shandong
 Taian: connection to Beijing–Shanghai railway
 Laiwu: connection to Xindian–Taian railway
 Rizhao: Yanzhou–Shijiusuo railway

See also
 List of railways in China

References

Railway lines in China
Rail transport in Henan
Rail transport in Shandong
Rail transport in Shanxi
Railway lines opened in 2014